Julie Ann Brown (born August 31, 1958) is an American actress, comedian, screen/television writer, singer-songwriter, and television director. Brown is known for her work in the 1980s, where she often played a quintessential valley girl character. Much of her comedy has revolved around the mocking of famous people (with a strong and frequently revisited focus on Madonna).

Early life
Julie Brown was born in Van Nuys, California, the daughter of Irish-Catholic parents Celia Jane (née McCann) and Leonard Francis Brown. Her father worked at NBC TV studios in the traffic department (advertising scheduling), and her mother was a secretary at the same studio complex. Both of Brown's grandfathers had worked in the Hollywood film business. Her great-grandfather was character actor Frank O'Connor. She attended a Catholic elementary school as a child, and later Van Nuys High School where she was chosen princess of the homecoming court. Brown's parents said "whatever you do, don't become an actress", but after attending Los Angeles Valley College she enrolled in the well-known San Francisco acting school, American Conservatory Theater, where she met future collaborator Charlie Coffey.

Career
Julie Brown began her career performing in nightclubs. She was a contestant on the game show Whew! (as Annie Brown). She started working on television with a guest spot on the sitcom Happy Days. She also appeared in the 1981 cult film Bloody Birthday. After a small role in the Clint Eastwood comedy film Any Which Way You Can, comedian Lily Tomlin saw Brown at a comedy club and gave her her first big break, a part in her 1981 film The Incredible Shrinking Woman. Tomlin and Brown eventually became close friends. A string of guest starring appearances in a variety of television shows followed, including: Laverne & Shirley, Buffalo Bill, The Jeffersons and Newhart.  Brown also appeared in short films such as "Five Minutes, Miss Brown".

In 1984, she released her first EP, a five-song album called Goddess in Progress. The album, parodies of popular '80s music combined with her valley girl personality, was quickly discovered by the Dr. Demento Show. The songs "'Cause I'm a Blonde" and "The Homecoming Queen's Got a Gun" were given radio airplay across the world. The latter was a spoof on stereotypical 1950s' teen tragedy songs, with cheerleaders' heads and pompoms being blown to pieces.

In 1987, Brown released her first full-length album, Trapped in the Body of a White Girl. The album highlighted her comedic talent and valley girl personality. The album's highlights were "I Like 'em Big and Stupid" and she reprised "The Homecoming Queen's Got a Gun" (the album was reissued on CD in 2010 by Collector's Choice Music on its Noble Rot label). Music videos were recorded and received heavy airplay on MTV. In 1989, Brown starred in that cable network's comedy and music-video show Just Say Julie. She played the role of a demanding, controlling, and pessimistic glamour-puss from the valley, making fun of popular music acts, while at the same time introducing their music videos (she was also known as "Miss Julie Brown" at the time to differentiate her from Downtown Julie Brown, who was on the network at the same time).

Brown's film career began in 1988 with the release of the film Earth Girls Are Easy, written, produced by, and featuring Brown, it was based loosely on a song by the same name from her debut EP. The film also starred Jeff Goldblum and Geena Davis. Brown cast then-unknown comedians Jim Carrey and Damon Wayans. In 1990 Brown had a brief part in the movie The Spirit of '76, as an intellectual stripper.

NBC commissioned a half-hour pilot, ultimately unsold and airing Sunday, July 28, 1991, at 7 p.m. Eastern Time, titled The Julie Show. Created by Brown, Charlie Coffey, and director and executive producer David Mirkin, it was a comedy about actress Julie Robbins (Brown), who in this initial story, goes to great lengths to land an interview with teen singer Kiki (played by Kim Walker) in the hopes of getting hired as a tabloid-TV celebrity journalist. Developed under the working title The Julie Brown Show, it also starred Marian Mercer as Julie's mother, June; DeLane Matthews as Debra Deacon, a reporter on the fictional series Inside Scoop; Susan Messing as Julie's roommate Cheryl; and Kevin O'Rourke as Inside Scoop producer Tony Barnow. Brown was also a producer, with John Ziffren, and performed and co-wrote the theme song. Walker, Don Sparks, Robin Angers, and Deborah Driggs were guest performers in this production from Mirkinvision and New World Television.

Another pilot was filmed for CBS in 1989 called, Julie Brown: The Show, and featured a similar theme, in which Brown was the hostess of a talk show and she would interview actual celebrity guests, interspersed with scripted scenarios. The pilot was aired, but the show was not picked up; years later, it leaked onto the Internet.

In 1992, Brown starred in her own Fox sketch comedy show, The Edge; two of its regulars, Jennifer Aniston and Wayne Knight, later became sitcom stars, while Tom Kenny went on to voice SpongeBob SquarePants. That same year, she released the Showtime television movie Medusa: Dare to Be Truthful, a satire about Madonna and her backstage documentary, Truth or Dare. (Brown's co-star was Kathy Griffin.)

Brown followed with another satire, Attack of the 5 Ft. 2 In. Women, which lampooned the violence of ice skater Tonya Harding toward rival Nancy Kerrigan, as well as that of widely publicized castrator Lorena Bobbitt.

She has continued to make television guest appearances and contributed voices to various cartoons, including Animaniacs (as the voice of Minerva Mink),  Aladdin as bratty mermaid Saleen, and as the original voice of Zatanna in the Batman: The Animated Series cartoon. Prior to this, she also guest starred on a Tiny Toon Adventures episode as Julie Bruin, a cartoon bear version of herself, in which she guest-starred in her own segment Just Say Julie Bruin, a reference to her music video show. The Just Say Julie Bruin cartoon also was a music video show and in her segment Elmer Fudd guest-starred as Fuddonna, a parody of Madonna and a reference to Julie Brown herself regularly mocking her.

Brown appeared as Coach Millie Stoeger in the film Clueless, reprising that role on ABC's 1996–1999 spin-off TV series, for which she was also a writer, producer and director. Two regulars from the series, Donald Faison and Elisa Donovan, later found similarly successful roles, as would featured player Christina Milian who had a recurring role on the series during its UPN years.  In 1998, Brown appeared in the parody movie Plump Fiction. In 2000, she created the series Strip Mall for the Comedy Central network; it ran two seasons.

Since 2004, Brown has been a commentator on E! network specials, including 101 Reasons the '90s Ruled, 101 Most Starlicious Makeovers, 101 Most Awesome Moments in Entertainment, and 50 Most Outrageous TV Moments.

In 2005, Brown purchased the rights to her Trapped album back from the record label and reissued it herself. She also self-released a single, "I Want to Be Gay". In late 2007, she also purchased the rights to her 1984 E.P. Goddess in Progress and re-released it as a full-length record with compiled unreleased tracks recorded during that era. Brown began touring in late 2007 with her one-woman show, Smell the Glamour.

In 2008, she co-wrote and appeared as Dee La Duke in the Disney Channel original movie Camp Rock, which starred Demi Lovato and the Jonas Brothers. Brown also joined the cast of the Canadian television series Paradise Falls that same year.

In late 2008 Brown began releasing one-track digital singles, starting with "The Ex-Beauty Queen's Got a Gun"; it was a rewrite of "Homecoming Queen" with lyrics about Sarah Palin. This was first aired in September, 2008 on The Stephanie Miller Show. In 2011 she released an album called Smell The Glamour, which features satires of Lady Gaga, Kesha and updated versions of her Medusa songs.

In the 2010–2011 television season, Brown began a recurring role as Paula Norwood, a neighbor and friend of the Heck family, on the ABC comedy The Middle. From 2010 to 2015 she was a writer for Melissa & Joey, and played a gym teacher in one episode of the show. In 2012 she appeared with Downtown Julie Brown as a guest judge on RuPaul's Drag Race.

In 2023, amid the announcement of Madonna: The Celebration Tour with a video inspired by Truth or Dare, Brown reprised her Medusa character parodying the announcement video in her social media.

Personal life
In 1983, Brown married writer and actor Terrence E. McNally, another frequent collaborator. They co-produced her first single, "I Like 'Em Big and Stupid". They divorced after six years. In 1994, Brown married Ken Rathjen, and together they have one son. She said in 2007 that she had recently divorced for the second time.

Filmography

Film

Television

Television film

Other work

Discography
 Goddess in Progress (1984)
 Trapped in the Body of a White Girl (1987)
 Smell the Glamour (2010)

Singles
 "I Like 'Em Big and Stupid" (w. B-side "The Homecoming Queen's Got a Gun")
 "Trapped in the Body of a White Girl"
 "Girl Fight Tonight!"
 "I Want to Be Gay" (sometimes titled "I Wanna be Gay")
 "The Homecoming Queen's Got a Gun"
 "The Art of Being Fabulous"
 "Another Drunk Chick" (a parody of the Kesha song "Tik Tok")
 "Big Clown Pants" (a parody of the Lady Gaga song "Bad Romance")

References

External links

1958 births
Actresses from Los Angeles
American comedy musicians
American women singers
American film actresses
American voice actresses
American sketch comedians
American television actresses
American television directors
American television writers
American women television directors
Living people
People from Van Nuys, Los Angeles
Sire Records artists
Van Nuys High School alumni
VJs (media personalities)
American women comedians
American women screenwriters
American women television writers
Comedians from California
Screenwriters from California
Songwriters from California
American Conservatory Theater alumni
20th-century American screenwriters
20th-century American women writers
21st-century American screenwriters
21st-century American women writers
20th-century American actresses
21st-century American actresses
American novelty song performers